Joseph Oluwaseyi Temitope Ayodele-Aribo (born 21 July 1996) is a professional footballer who plays as a midfielder for Premier League club Southampton and the Nigeria national team. 

He began his club career at Staines Town then spent four years with Charlton Athletic in the English Football League. In 2019 he signed for Rangers, where he won the Scottish Premiership in 2021 and the Scottish Cup a year later. 

Born and raised in London, Aribo plays for the Nigeria national team, being eligible due to his heritage. He gained his first cap in 2019 and was part of their squad for the 2021 Africa Cup of Nations.

Club career

Staines Town
Aribo played for Staines Town under Marcus Gayle in the Isthmian League Premier Division, winning the club's academy player of the year award in April 2014.

Charlton Athletic
Aribo joined Charlton Athletic in September 2015 following a successful trial, and signed a one-year contract in May 2016. He made his first-team debut as a 62nd-minute substitute for Andrew Crofts in a 2–0 defeat to Crawley Town in an EFL Trophy group stage match at The Valley on 16 October 2016. His EFL League One debut came on 17 December in a 2–0 home loss to Peterborough United as a 70th-minute replacement for Fredrik Ulvestad, and six days later he extended his contract until 2019.

Aribo scored his first career goal on 1 November 2017, the winner in a 3–2 home win over Fulham under-21 in the EFL Trophy group stage. His first league goal on 23 December opened a 1–1 draw with Blackpool at The Valley; he netted four more goals over the season to help the Addicks to sixth place and the playoffs, including two on 2 April 2018 in a 3–1 win against Rotherham United.

Aribo scored in each of the last three games of 2018–19 as Charlton came third, contributing to wins over Scunthorpe United, Gillingham and Rochdale. On 12 May, he then netted in a 2–1 win away to Doncaster Rovers in the first leg of the playoff semi-finals, as his team eventually were promoted.

Rangers
Aribo was offered a new contract by Charlton at the end of the 2018–19 season, but he instead opted to sign a four-year deal with Scottish Premiership club Rangers. He made his competitive debut for the club on 9 July 2019 in a 4–0 win over St Joseph's of Gibraltar in the Europa League; eight days later in the second leg he scored his first goal to open a 6–0 win at Ibrox. On 25 September, he suffered a head wound from Livingston's Ricki Lamie and was taken off after 20 minutes, receiving 20 stitches and being ruled out for a month; on his return to Almondvale he scored his first league goal in a 2–0 win on 10 November.

Aribo contributed seven goals to Rangers' 2020–21 title-winning season, including two in an 8–0 win over Hamilton Academical on 8 November. In May, he was singled out for praise by manager Steven Gerrard for playing as an emergency left-back due to Borna Barišić's absence in a 3–0 win at Livingston: "That left-back performance is as good as we have seen in my three years that I have been here. So well done to him for parking his ego and doing a fantastic job for his teammates".

In 2021–22, Aribo played 17 Europa League games as Rangers finished runners-up, and he opened the scoring in the 1–1 final draw against Eintracht Frankfurt on 18 May before defeat on penalties. In all competitions, he played 57 games, scored nine goals and assisted 10.

Southampton 
On 9 July 2022, Aribo joined Southampton and signed a four-year contract. On 6 August 2022, Aribo made his Premier League debut in Southampton’s 4–1 defeat to Tottenham Hotspur. A week later, Aribo scored his first goal for Southampton in their 2–2 draw against Leeds United.

International career
In August 2019, Aribo was called up by Nigeria manager Gernot Rohr for a friendly away to Ukraine. He made his debut in the game in Dnipro on 10 September, and scored in the fourth minute of the 2–2 draw. On 13 October, he scored the Green Eagles' goal in a friendly draw with Brazil in Singapore.

At the 2021 Africa Cup of Nations in Cameroon, Aribo played two group-stage wins and the 1–0 last-16 elimination by Tunisia.

Style of play
Aribo is a versatile player who can play centrally or in a wide midfield role. Technically proficient, he is able to use his long legs to shield the ball from opponents effectively. Speaking in October 2016, he said that his strengths were "driving with the ball and getting up the pitch".

Career statistics

Club

International

Scores and results list Nigeria's goal tally first.

Honours
Charlton Athletic
EFL League One play-offs: 2019

Rangers
Scottish Premiership: 2020–21
Scottish Cup: 2021–22
Scottish League Cup runner-up: 2019–20
 UEFA Europa League runner-up: 2021–22

References

1996 births
Living people
Footballers from Camberwell
Citizens of Nigeria through descent
Nigerian footballers
Nigeria international footballers
English footballers
English people of Nigerian descent
Association football midfielders
Staines Town F.C. players
Charlton Athletic F.C. players
National League (English football) players
English Football League players
Black British sportspeople
Rangers F.C. players
Southampton F.C. players
Scottish Professional Football League players
2021 Africa Cup of Nations players
Premier League players